The Mountain Province State Polytechnic College is the only public college in Mountain Province. It is mandated to provide higher professional, technical and special instructions for special purposes and promote research and extension services, advanced studies and progressive leadership in agriculture, education, forestry, engineering, arts, sciences, humanities, and other fields. Its main campus is in Bontoc, Mountain Province.

History

The first idea of having a college in Mountain Province is credited to Alfredo Belingon who was then the Social Studies Supervisor in the BIAK (Bontoc, Ifugao, Apayao-Kalinga) Division and who subsequently retired as Schools Division Superintendent of Kalinga-Apayao. He started working for the establishment of the Mountain Province Community College and nursed it for two or more years before he was appointed Assistant Superintendent of Kalinga-Apayao. Dr. Allyson Belagan took over as officer-in-charge of the college for one year before handing it over to his full-time successor.

In 1973, John “Kodoo” Daoas was pulled from the Eastern Philippine Colleges to run the new college. Bringing in his experiences as a professor and administrator of a tertiary institution, he harnessed whatever resources there were and continued the programs of his predecessor. In 1992, four degree programs were offered: Bachelor of Science in Elementary Education, Bachelor of Science in Commerce, Bachelor of Science in Accountancy, and Bachelor of Arts. Two non-degree programs which were Midwifery and Junior Secretarial were also offered.

Governance of the Mountain Province Community College was in the hands of a Board of Directors headed by the Provincial Governor. The first chairman of the Board of Directors was Gov. Jaime K. Gomez. Besides its policy formulation function, the Board of Directors was tasked to secure funding support for the college. The Community College, however, drew its main operating expenses from the fees paid by the students which were far from sufficient to meet the needs of the college.

This deplorable financial status of the college challenged individuals to work for its conversion into a state college. As early as 1975, then regional director Telesforo Boquiren and his assistant regional director Bernardo M. Reyes started discussing the possibility of establishing a state college in Mountain Province. Proposals were written and submitted to then Education Secretary Juan Manuel but without positive result. The efforts to open such a state college were mainly through the administrative route of the Ministry of Education and Culture. There was no political support outside the province to re-enforce the efforts of the Department of Education in its quest for the establishment of a state college.

In 1978, the first election for the national assembly or Batasang Pambansa was held, and Hon. Victor S. Dominguez was elected as one of the assemblymen, representing Region I. He was about to file a bill for the creation of Mountain Province State College but was overtaken by a moratorium imposed against the establishment of additional state colleges. With the moratorium, the drive to open a state college in Mountain Province was temporarily withheld.

After the reorganization of the Congress of the Philippines in 1987, Dominguez was re-elected, and one of his priorities was the establishment of a state college in Mountain Province. The first House Bill (HB No. 00180) was filed on August 6, 1987. Unfortunately, the same did not prosper during that year. On May 28, 1991, Honorable Dominguez filed another bill titled “ An Act converting the Mountain Province Community College to be known as the Mountain Province State Polytechnic College, Integrating therewith the Tadian School of Arts and Trades in the Municipality of Tadian; the Bacarri Agricultural High School in the Municipality of Paracelis; and the Eastern Bontoc National Agricultural School in the Municipality of Barlig, all in Mountain Province, and Appropriating Funds thereof ”. This bill was approved on First Reading on June 3, 1991, Second Reading on August 15, 1991, and third Reading on September 4, 1991, and was acted upon by the President of the Republic of the Philippines Cory C. Aquino on January 17, 1992, which finally became Republic Act No. 7182. With the enactment of R.A. 7182, the dream of establishing a state college in Mountain Province was finally realized. This marked a significant event in the history of MPSPC.

This law defines the identity of the institution as a government corporation and spells out its vision and mission. As a corporation, the institution is governed by a Board of Trustees which is the law-making body of the Polytechnic. The Board formulates policies which  guide the college in the realization of its vision and accomplishment of its mission. These policies are made to meet the peculiar needs of the Polytechnic which are not needed in other institutions or agencies. The Governing Board also sees to it that decisions and actions of the president of the Polytechnic are made in accordance to the policies it has passed and other directives issued by proper authorities. Thus, the Board has to confirm major decisions made by the College President.
       
With the enactment of R.A. 7182, Dr. Marcelino T. Delson was appointed as the first college president who assumed office, from 1992 to July 2004. He was succeeded by NEDA-CAR director Juan B. Ngalob, who served as OIC-president from August 2004 to March 2005. In April 2005, Dr. Nieves A. Dacyon took over the administration after having been elected college president in February 2005 and appointed into office on March 31, 2005.

During the incumbency of the then president Fidel V. Ramos, Hon. Dominguez made representation at Malacanang to source funds for the establishment of the Bauko Campus. He donated his titled lot to establish a main campus with standard and complete facilities that would have made  MPSPC the center of tertiary education in the Cordillera. Unfortunately, however, this plan did not fully materialize except for the construction of an administration building and one academic building.

From 2012-2013, Dr. Geraldine L. Madjaco became the OIC-President before Dr. Euphemia Lam-en became the College President in 2013. Dr. Josephine Ngodcho was appointed as the OIC-President in the same year.

From 2014- July 25, 2022, Dr. Rexton F. Chakas served as the College President and OIC President from July 26, 2022 to September 22, 2022. His administration focused in the intensive investment on construction, development  and improvement of  teaching-learning infrastructures and facilities as well as advancement of programs in accreditation and  government recognitions, and ISO Certification of administrative and all other support services and the College's Universityhood status.

At present, Dr. Edgar G. Cue is the College President. He took his oath as the next College President on September 23, 2022 at the CHED National Office.

Campuses

College of Arts and Sciences (CAS) – Bontoc Campus which is the former Mountain Province College.

College of Engineering and Technology (CET) – Tadian Campus which opened in 1992 is the former Tadian School of Arts and Trades. It took over the collegiate programs offered by the Tadian School of Arts and Trades which were turned over by the Department of Education, Culture and Sports. In June, 2005, the campus also absorbed the College of Forestry which was opened in Mount Data, Bauko,  Mountain Province in 1995 but was unable to sustain sufficient enrollees, hence the transfer to Tadian Campus for better management took place in June, 2006.

Bauko Campus in Baang, Bauko which houses the College Administration and the offices of the Research and Extension Unit and the Production Unit as well.

College of Agriculture, the Paracelis Campus in Bacarri, Paracelis which is the extension campus of Tadian campus offers programs in Agricultural Technology

Courses Offered

Bontoc Campus 
 Graduate School
  - Doctor of Education
  - Master of Arts in Education
  - Master of Arts in Science Education
  - Master in Public Administration
  - Master in Business Administration
  - Master in Teaching English
  - Master in Rural Development & Indigenous Peoples Education
  - Master of Science in Criminal Justice, Major in Criminology
 Undergraduate Programs
  - Bachelor of Arts in Political Science
  - Bachelor of Science in Accountancy
  - Bachelor of Science in Business Administration
  - Bachelor of Science in Criminology
  - Bachelor of Early Childhood Education
  - Bachelor of Special Needs Education
  - Bachelor of Science in Elementary Education
  - Bachelor of Science in Secondary Education
  - Bachelor of Science in Information Technology
  - Bachelor of Science in Nursing
  - Bachelor of Science in Office Administration
  - Bachelor of Science in Tourism
  - Bachelor of Science in Hotel and Restaurant Management
  - Associate of Arts in Hotel and Restaurant Management

Tadian Campus 
 Undergraduate Programs
  - Bachelor of Elementary Education
  - Bachelor of Secondary Education
  - Bachelor in Technical Teacher Education
  - Bachelor of Science in Civil Engineering
  - Bachelor of Science in Electrical Engineering
  - Bachelor of Science in Geodetic Engineering
  - Bachelor of Science in Agroforestry
  - Bachelor of Science in Forestry
  - Bachelor of Agricultural Technology
  - Bachelor of Science in Agribusiness
  - Bachelor of Science in Environmental Science
  - Bachelor of Science in Entrepreneurship

Student population

Starting with 15 undergraduate curricular offerings with 720 enrollees in 1992, the college now offers 24 undergraduate and 8 graduate programs with an average enrolment of about 5,000 students per  semester.

References

External links

State universities and colleges in the Philippines
Universities and colleges in Mountain Province